From 2014 onwards, software which manipulated air pollution tests was discovered in vehicles from some car makers; the software recognized when the standardized emissions test was being done, and adjusted the engine to emit less during the test. The cars emitted much higher levels of pollution under real-world driving conditions. Some cars' emissions were higher even though there was no manipulated software.

Scandals relating to higher-than-reported emissions from diesel engines began in 2014 when the International Council on Clean Transportation (ICCT) reported discrepancies between European and US models of vehicles. This began with the Volkswagen emissions scandal. Independent tests carried out by the German car club ADAC proved that, under normal driving conditions, diesel vehicles including the Volvo S60, Renault's Espace Energy and the Jeep Renegade, exceeded legal European emission limits for nitrogen oxide by more than 10 times.  ICCT and ADAC showed the biggest deviations from Volvo, Renault, Jeep, Hyundai, Citroën and Fiat.

Researchers have criticized the inadequacy of current regulations and called for the use of a UN-sanctioned test called Worldwide harmonized Light vehicles Test Procedures that better reflects real-life driving conditions. The test only came into force in 2017, with critics saying that car firms lobbied fiercely to delay its implementation due to the high cost of meeting stricter environmental controls.

Conservative Internal Market spokesman Daniel Dalton – who led the legislation through the European Parliament – described the previous regulations as "at best patchy and at worst ineffective." He further said that his latest 2018 report introduced a strong, transparent system to ensure cars are safe and meet emissions standards.

Since 2016, 38 out of 40 diesel cars tested by ADAC failed a -test.

Manufacturers

Volkswagen 

The Volkswagen emissions scandal started on 18 September 2015, when the United States Environmental Protection Agency (EPA) issued a notice of violation of the Clean Air Act to German automaker Volkswagen Group. Volkswagen had intentionally programmed turbocharged direct injection (TDI) diesel engines to activate emissions controls only during emissions testing.

In January 2017, VW pleaded guilty to the emissions scandal and agreed to pay US$4.3 billion in penalties. As of January 2019, 13 VW employees have been indicted, including former CEO Martin Winterkorn. In addition, two former executives (Oliver Schmidt and James Robert Liang) have pleaded guilty in US court and sentenced to prison terms.

Fiat Chrysler 
On 12 January 2017, the EPA issued a notice of violation to Fiat Chrysler Automobiles (FCA) alleging that over 100,000 model year 2014, 2015, and 2016 diesel SUVs and trucks, including Dodge Ram 1500 and Jeep Grand Cherokee trucks, had software that allowed them to exceed  pollution limits, undetected by the usual testing methods. The EPA discovered this during their expanded vehicle tests following the Volkswagen case. FCA was not accused of intentionally cheating on emissions testing, though the EPA did accuse the company of failing to notify the government of the defeat device programming. The US Justice Department was assisting the EPA in their investigation, suggesting the possibility of criminal charges. This is all while FCA executives were hopeful that after the inauguration of President Donald Trump it would be possible to "work with the new administration to try and get this issue behind us", according to FCA CEO Sergio Marchionne. Executives denied any wrongdoing but stated to make extensive changes to their vehicle software to address the EPA's concerns.

As part of a January 2019 settlement, Fiat Chrysler recalled and repaired approximately 100,000 automobiles equipped with a 3.0-litre V6 EcoDiesel engine having a prohibited defeat device, pay $311 million in total civil penalties to US regulators and CARB, pay $72.5 million for state civil penalties, implement corporate governance reforms, and pay $33.5 million to mitigate excess pollution. The company will also pay affected consumers up to $280 million and offer extended warranties on such vehicles worth $105 million. The total value of the settlement is worth about $800 million, though FCA did not admit liability, and it did not resolve an ongoing criminal investigation.

In October 2020, Fiat Chrysler faced a £5 billion class-action lawsuit in the UK due to over half a million Fiat, Alfa Romeo, Jeep, Iveco and Suzuki vehicles having these defeat devices.

In connection with the mentioned software, Emanuele Palma, a diesel drivability and emissions senior manager at Fiat Chrysler, was charged with one count of conspiracy to defraud the United States, to violate the Clean Air Act and to commit wire fraud. Palma was also charged with six counts of violating the Clean Air Act, four counts of wire fraud and two counts of making false statements to representatives of the FBI and the EPA's Criminal Investigation Division (EPA-CID). On 3 March 2021, Sergio Pasini and Gianluca Sabbioni, two Italian nationals and alleged co-conspirators of Palma, were indicted.

In 2022 FCA US, formerly Chrysler Group, pleaded guilty to one count of conspiracy to defraud the US, commit wire fraud, and to violate the Clean Air Act.

Jeep 
High level of pollutants were emitted by Jeep Grand Cherokee when its engine was hot.

Opel (General Motors) 
Opel, a German brand then-owned by General Motors, was caught using a defeat device in Europe in 2015.

The engine software changed the engine behavior based on whether two or four wheels were rotating. In an Opel Zafira front-wheel-drive vehicle, the  emissions were within the 80 mg/km legal limit – but only when the vehicle was on a test stand, with the front wheels rotating and the rear wheels being stationary. When the rear, unpowered wheels were made to rotate too (which is how a front-wheel-drive vehicle behaves on the road), the  emission were twice the limit (cold engine) or three to four times the limit (warmed-up engine).

Despite the facts, Opel denied using defeat devices, called the tests "untrustworthy" and "incomprehensible", and one of the scientists involved in testing the car and discovering the discrepancy, Professor Jan Czerwinski from the Bern University of Applied Sciences, was pressured into issuing a statement to a news agency saying that "the facts could be distorted, incomplete or tendentious for various reasons". That was despite those tests being done according to the established (and undemanding) NEDC prodedure.

Opel publicly demonstrated (while representatives from the TÜV Hessen were present) a Zafira that met the  emission limits. At the same time, Opel started clandestinely pushing an engine software update that limited  emissions in Zafiras that were already on the road, and was caught doing so by Belgian journalists from the VRT news station. The software update dramatically lowered  emissions in the cars, and was installed in customers' cars during service center visits without their knowing.

Nissan 
In September 2015 Renault-Nissan CEO Carlos Ghosn said it would be difficult for an automaker to conceal internally an effort to falsify vehicle emissions data, as happened at Volkswagen AG: "I don't think you can do something like this hiding in the bushes."

In May 2016, South Korean authorities accused Nissan of using a defeat device for manipulating emissions data for the British-built Nissan Qashqai, allegations which the Japanese carmaker denied.

Renault 
Renault issued press statements reaffirming their vehicles' compliance with all regulations and legislation for the markets in which they operate in 2015.

Headquarters of Renault and Peugeot were raided by fraud investigators in January and April 2016, respectively. Renault subsequently recalled 15,000 cars for emission testing and fixing.

Since 2015, Renault has been investigated by the French Direction générale de la concurrence, de la consommation et de la répression des fraudes (DGCCRF). It affects 900,000 vehicles. Renault Captur and Clio IV exceeded the threshold for carbon dioxide emissions by 377% and 305%.

In 2019, Renault's Clio and Captur diesel models were found to emit more pollutants outside of official test conditions, their exhaust treatment did not work in everyday use when the outside temperature range was below or above those covering official tests. Furthermore, their " trap" devices did not run cleaning cycles below , causing those filters to clog and become ineffective.

Mercedes-Benz 
Even though up to 2018 there were increasingly specific allegations of defeat devices in the control software for Mercedes-Benz U.S. cars, Mercedes-Benz denies the charges. As of June 24, 2019 Daimler insisted its diesels didn't break the law. European vehicle emissions rules were loosely written. Turning down or switching off emission controls to protect the engine in certain circumstances – such as lower temperatures – was allowed. Earlier, Feb 2018, German newspaper Bild am Sonntag reported that US authorities investigating Mercedes have discovered that its vehicles are equipped with illegal software to help them pass United States' stringent emission tests.

In June 2019 Daimler recalled 60,000 Mercedes diesel powered cars in Germany, the model affected is the Mercedes-Benz GLK 220 SUV produced between 2012 and 2015, car is fitted with software aimed at distorting emissions tests. Germany's vehicle authority, the Federal Motor Transport Authority is looking to extend investigations of cheating devices reportedly used in Daimler's C-Class and E-Class OM642 and OM651 engines. The number could be as high as 700,000 vehicles.

In September 2019, Daimler was fined 870 million euros in Germany for "negligent violation of supervisory duties" in relation to not fully complying with emissions regulations.

Audi & Porsche 
In July 2019, Deutsche Umwelthilfe (DUH) (German Environmental Aid) published a press release in which it states that Porsche-vehicles equipped with Audi-diesel-engines of the Euro 5 and Euro 6 emission standards exceed the limit values for nitrogen oxides many times over.

The statutory  limit for diesel passenger cars Euro 5 is 180 mg /km. The Porsche Panamera equipped with the VW-EA897 engine, made by Audi, exhibited an 8.3-fold limit violation with an average  emissions of 1,498 mg/km, according to DUH. According to DUH data, the measurements were made at outside temperatures between +10 and +14 °C. Two Porsche Cayenne with the EA897evo engine (Euro 6) are said to have exceeded the applicable limit of 80 mg/km  in normal mode by 3.6 or 4.2 times. Limits exceeding by the Cayenne in normal mode increases according to DUH in sport mode with the same driving style by two times. Also the arranged software update by the Federal Motor Transport Authority (Kraftfahrt-Bundesamt) does not prevent exceeding the limit. A tested Porsche Cayenne, emission standard Euro 6, exceeds the limit by 2.4 times at +10 to +16 °C with an average of 191 mg /km after the software update. In addition, the vehicle with a carbon dioxide emissions of 179 g CO2/km is permitted, but in real operation on the road, according to DUH, the emissions are on average 241 g CO2/km. In addition to the diesel passenger car Audi A8 4.2 TDI with emission standard Euro 6, which according to own data was measured on average 1,422 mg /km, also showed further new measurements on Audi Models High  Limit Exceedances. An examined Audi SQ5 plus 3.0 TDI with emission standard Euro 6, with the same engine generation (EA897evo) as the Porsche Cayenne, emits an average of 441 mg / km at outside temperatures between +4 and +11 °C. The measurements were carried out by the DUH according to the press release on the road using PEMS.

Initiated by the measurements, the DUH called on the manufacturers to publish a complete overview of all installed defeat devices for every diesel vehicle and to commit themselves to repair the diesel exhaust gas cleaning for all affected diesel buyers to help a legally compliant vehicle – or to reimburse them the full purchase price. It also announced that it will make the measurements results available to law enforcement agencies, the European Antitrust Authority and all concerned stakeholders and their lawyers. At the same time the DUH renewed their criticism of the Federal Motor Transport Authority and of Andreas Scheuer (Head of Federal Ministry of Transport and Digital Infrastructure), who according to the DUH-President on the one hand restraint documents about the detected defeat devices in the vehicles, despite final convictions for disclosure, and secondly prevent officially ordered hardware retrofits.

BMW
BMW was implicated in an "emissions cartel" which sought to restrict design standards for AdBlue fuel additive. They were fined €875m along with VW in July 2021.

In 2018 BMW recalled 11,700 cars which had incorrect emissions software installed to some diesel cars. The company denied using defeat devices, as suggested by the KBA.

BMW was sued in 2018 when certain models were named as producing several times more nitrogen oxide emissions than laboratory tests indicated. They were accused of colluding with Robert Bosch GmbH and LLC to produce defeat software to hide the cars' true emissions.

Previous defeat device cases 

The Volkswagen TDI diesel emissions case is not the first use of defeat devices by Volkswagen or other automakers nor the first time automakers have taken advantage of their foreknowledge of the specific lab test conditions in order to engage emissions controls only during testing, but not during normal driving.

In 1973 Chrysler, Ford, General Motors, Toyota, and Volkswagen had to remove ambient temperature switches which affected emissions, though the companies denied intentional cheating and said that strategies like enriching fuel mixture during cold engine warm-up periods could reduce overall pollution. The switches were ordered to be removed from production but cars already on the road did not have to be recalled, and fines were relatively modest.

In 1996, GM had to pay a near-record fine of $11 million, and recall 470,000 vehicles, because of ECU software programmed to disengage emissions controls during conditions known to exist when the cars were not being lab tested by the EPA. The model year 1991–1995 Cadillacs were programmed to simply enrich the engine's fuel mixture, increasing carbon monoxide (CO) and unburned hydrocarbon (HC) pollution, any time the car's air conditioning or heater was turned on, since the testing protocol specified they would be off.

In 1996, Fiat of Brazil paid a record fine because of the Fiat Mille Electronic, a very popular version of the Fiat Uno with a 1.0-litre engine. They sold 500,000 vehicles with a combination of carburettor and digital ignition that uses different strategies for laboratory or street driving conditions.

In 1998, Honda Motor Company had to spend $267 million to correct the disabling of the misfire monitoring device on 1.6 million 1996 and 1997 model year vehicles, and Ford Motor Company paid $7.8 million for programming 60,000 1997 Ford Econoline vans to exceed emissions standards during normal highway cruising speeds.

A timer-based strategy was used by seven heavy truck manufacturers, Caterpillar Inc., Cummins Engine Company, Detroit Diesel Corporation, Mack Trucks, Navistar International, Renault Véhicules Industriels, and Volvo Trucks, who in 1998 paid the largest ever fine to date, $83.4 million, for, in the same manner as Volkswagen, programming trucks to keep  emissions low during the test cycle, and then disabling the controls and emitting up to three times the maximum during normal highway driving.

The goal of both the Ford and the heavy truck defeat devices was better fuel economy than could be achieved under pollution limits. The major truck manufacturers also had to spend up to $1 billion to correct the problem, which affected 1.3 million heavy duty diesel trucks.

While Volkswagen's actions have precedents, the Center for Auto Safety's Clarence Ditlow said that Volkswagen "took it to another level of sophisticated deception we've never seen before."

EU vehicle approval procedures 
In May 2017, the 28 EU member states agreed to begin negotiations with EU institutions to revise the method of testing vehicle emissions towards real circumstances, with random testing of vehicles on the roads and fines for manufacturers who breach the rules.

Eben Moglen has suggested in 2010 to make proprietary software source code in general accessible to the public, to curb cheating.

See also 
 Business action on climate change
 Diesel particulate filter
 Diesel exhaust fluid
 ExxonMobil climate change controversy
 Greenwashing
 NOx adsorber – a system to trap oxides of nitrogen used by Volkswagen "Clean Diesel" cars

Notes 

2015 in the environment
2015 in technology
2015 in transport
2015 scandals
Corporate scandals
Emissions reduction
Environmental controversies
Fraud in the European Union
Fraud in the United States
History of the diesel engine
Regulatory compliance
Scandals in Germany
Scandals in the United States
2015 in Germany
2015 in the United States
Emissions violations
Emissions violations